Male ( Rain), is a 2015 Indian Kannada language romantic comedy film directed by Tejas and produced by  R. Chandru under his home banner. The film stars Prem Kumar and Amulya in the lead roles. Most of the filming took place at Bangalore and Sakleshpur localities. The film is  released on 7 August 2015.

Cast
 Prem Kumar as Varun
 Amulya as Varsha
 Sadhu Kokila
 Bullet Prakash
 Padmaja Rao
 Jai Jagadish
 Shivaram
 Gowthami
 Nagendra Shah
 Ninasam Siddharth

Soundtrack

The music for the film and soundtracks were composed by Jassie Gift. The soundtrack album consists of 6 tracks and was leaked on the internet prior to the release.

The song Life is Awesome was reused in the Odia movie Jaga Hatare Pagha.

Release
After several times of postponement, the film was reported to be finally releasing on 7 August 2015. The film's producer and distributor, RS Productions' Srinivas announced the film would release on the first week of August.

References

External links
 

2015 films
2010s Kannada-language films
Indian romantic comedy films
2015 romantic comedy films